Papaver pinnatifidum is a species of plant in the family Papaveraceae.

Sources

References 

pinnatifidum
Flora of Malta